Richard L. Casson  (born December 30, 1948 in Calgary, Alberta) is a Canadian politician. Casson was a member of the Conservative Party of Canada in the House of Commons of Canada, representing the riding of Lethbridge from 1997 to 2011.

Before politics
Casson is a former manager of printing services. Casson was mayor of Picture Butte, Alberta from 1986 to 1995 and a councillor before that.

Entrance to politics
In the 1997 federal election Casson received 55.5% of the popular vote. He went on to receive 66% in the 2000 election, 63% support in the 2004 election and 67.3% in the 2006 election.

He has been a member of the Canadian Alliance (2000–2003) and the Reform Party of Canada (1997–2000). Casson was the Chairman of the Standing Committee on National Defence and Co-Chair - Permanent Joint Board on Defence.

In 2003, Rick Casson supported the Iraq war, and in spring 2006 voted yes to the extension of Canadian military deployment in Afghanistan to 2009.

On January 7, 2010 Casson announced that he would not be running in the next election, which was held on May 2, 2011.

On October 1, 2010, he was appointed to the Queen's Privy Council for Canada in recognition of "many years of dedication and hard work in the House of Commons, including on Canada’s engagement in Afghanistan".

References

External links
Official site
How'd They Vote?: Rick Casson's voting history and quotes

1948 births
Canadian Alliance MPs
Conservative Party of Canada MPs
Living people
Mayors of places in Alberta
Members of the House of Commons of Canada from Alberta
Members of the King's Privy Council for Canada
People from Lethbridge
Politicians from Calgary
Reform Party of Canada MPs
21st-century Canadian politicians